KAG may refer to:

 Communist Working Groups (Swedish: Kommunistiska Arbetsgrupperna), a former political organization in Sweden
 Kajaman language, by ISO 639 language code
 Gangneung Air Base, South Korea Air Force, Gangwon-do, IATA code
 Kauno Autobusų Gamykla, bus factory in Kaunas, Lithuanian SSR 1956-1979
 KiriKiri, an adventure game system
 King Arthur's Gold, an online multiplayer action game